The Honorverse is a military science fiction book series, its two subseries, two prequel series, and anthologies created by David Weber and published by Baen Books. They are centered on the space navy career of the principal protagonist Honor Harrington. The books have made The New York Times Best Seller list.

Plot
The series follows Honor Harrington, military heroine and later, influential politician, during a time of extreme interstellar change and tension. Most of the more than 20 novels and anthology collections cover events between 4000 and 4022 AD with "PD" (Post-Diaspora) dating beginning with a dispersal to the stars from our sun ("Sol") in 2103 AD. The main series novels are set primarily in a timeline beginning 40 years after Harrington's birth on October 1, 3962 AD (1859 PD), and some short stories flesh out her earlier career. Additional novels and shorter fiction take place up to 350 years earlier, and still-earlier canon history is filled in between narratives and in appendices attached to the main novels and anthologies.

The political makeup and history of the series frequently echoes actual history, particularly that of Europe in the last half of the second millennium. The series is consciously modeled on the Horatio Hornblower series by C. S. Forester, and its main character, like Horatio Hornblower, on a mix of Thomas Cochrane and Admiral Lord Nelson. Weber originally planned for Harrington to die in the fifth book. This was later changed to parallel Nelson by having her die at the peak of her career in the climactic Battle of Manticore in 1921 PD (4024 AD), then continue the series with her children as the main protagonists. However, collaborating author Eric Flint intervened, asking for the invention of a mutual enemy for both the Star Kingdom of Manticore and the Republic of Haven to oppose in a spy-and-counterspy spin-off sub-series the two contractually agreed to co-write, just as they have contracts to write in Flint's 1632 universe. This "rethink" and redesign caused Weber to move the series' internal chronology up by about 20 years and begat the Crown of Slaves novel, first in the "Crown of Slaves" sub-series based on a number of the short stories of the first four collections. In this scenario, proxies for Manticore and Haven oppose the same hidden enemy, the genetic slavers and powers behind the government and corporations of the planet of Mesa. Mesa is later revealed in Mission of Honor to be part of a secret cabal of about a dozen highly capable planets that are busily building a secret navy using advanced technologies at a secret planet and known to itself as the Mesan Alignment. The Mesan Alignment's navy has new technology and conducts a sneak attack on Manticore in 1922 PD during the twelfth mainline novel, Mission of Honor. The Mesans have a 600-year-old secret program to reinstitute purposeful genetic engineering of humans and break up the Solarian League, while taking down all opponents opposing such genetic engineering. This makes the staunchly anti-genetic-slavery star nations of Haven, Manticore, and various associates of the planet Beowulf primary targets of the Mesan Alignment. The "Crown of Slaves" sub-series books and last two mainline Honorverse novels detail the rising extent of this threat.

As the two sub-series progress, albeit with somewhat-separate casts of characters, each is expected by Weber to carry the detailed storyline events particular to their astrographical region forward and tie together into an ongoing plotline concerning the massive and monolithic Solarian League, which foreshadowing in the most recent novels suggests is about to undergo severe disruption. The thirteenth mainline novel, A Rising Thunder, ties together events in both sub-series and synchronizes the timeline of each sub-series with Honor Harrington's mainline novels. This book confirms the Solarian League is officially now the new Mesan cat's paw, effectively at war with both the Star Empire of Manticore and the Republic of Haven, as it has been manipulated into error after error by the operatives of the Mesan Alignment.

Setting
Among a handful of anthologies, the thirteen Honor-centered novels, and two subordinate sub-series starring some different characters, the universe first explored in On Basilisk Station has a diasporal historical background for the backstory storyline, in which mankind, over almost two millennia, migrated to systems beyond the Sol system, first in slower-than-light starships, then by increasingly efficient and effective hyperspace drive-propulsion systems. Early daughter colonies also spawned colonies, forming regional networks of related populations. With travel limited to slower-than-light speeds, any marginally habitable nearby planet was of interest, and Earth's scientists went through a period in which they regularly genetically modified the human genome for survival positive adaptations to marginal environments, such as heavy gravity, thin atmosphere, thick atmospheres, or toxic environments (e.g. Grayson). Some corporate entities also began breeding for super soldiers and superior intellects, good looks, sexual prowess, etc., or mixes of such traits, practices that led to a horrific "Final War" on Old Earth. Long-established and advanced daughter colonies like Beowulf mounted a variety of rescue missions and initiated a thousand-year effort to clean up the Earth gene pool. For a time, the cultural centre moved off the Earth as it took about 500 years for the planetary economy to recover its pre-eminence within its shell of highly populated, highly developed planets. Located in the center of the spherical Solarian League, Earth's Old Chicago eventually re-emerged as the nominal League Capital.

By the Gregorian calendar currently in use, the Honorverse novels are dated beginning with year 2103 A.D.—the epoch date of the Diaspora's beginning.

The FTL hyperspace propulsion system in the stories is around 600 years old at the time period in which the novels are placed. This technology uses the ability to "sail" along a vast network of "gravity waves" on different successively higher hyperbands, each higher band giving a more-efficient speed multiplier but requiring more powerful (therefore bulkier and more expensive) engines to reach; the higher bands significantly shortening transit times on a given gravity wave for a given base speed, which is limited by particle densities and radiation shielding as Newtonian speeds increase. Analogous to prevailing trade winds creating certain favoured sea routes on Earth, the relatively static fixed gravity waves form favoured travel paths. A lack of gravity waves in some regions means that they must be plodded across by relatively slower means. These favorite routes and desert crossing points are susceptible to illegitimate exploitation by pirates and commerce-raiding warships, both interested in preying on the rich pickings of the interstellar merchant cargo ships that carry upwards of 2–7 million metric tonnes of cargo.

Within each hyperband, ships have a local speed limited by particle densities that, at high relative speeds, become cosmic radiation. Better physical shielding or a better particle shield generator enables faster speeds within the band, on which base speed, multiplied by that band's multiplier, results in shorter journey times. Merchant ships have immense size and thin walls with virtually no physical shielding, as well as cheaper, relatively weak particle shield generators and hyper generators. Commercial carriers, like sailing ships and freight trains of Old Earth, trade off journey time by increased size and volume carried, so as to keep shipping costs economical. Military vessels, having no profit motive and already physically shielded, also carry better particle shield generators and can attain much faster interstellar voyage times both within a band, and because their better protections enables them to enter higher hyperbands with higher local particle counts, but higher speed multipliers.

The interaction of gravity effects also manifest in much rarer, generally widely scattered wormholes, through which hyperdrive equipped ships can travel virtually instantaneously between the wormhole's end points. In some systems, several of these wormholes are found to be co-located forming an irresistible trading nexus, perhaps because their ends have some mathematical affinity: they occur with entrances relatively close together in very small spatial volumes.

The greatest known aggregation of these co-located "Junctions" or Terminus Loci occurs in the Manticore binary star system, whose wormholes connect the wormhole junction to six (later seven) other star systems, giving the Manticore system an astrographic position to be coveted, and an immense revenue stream from transit tolls, manufacturing and trade, and a large carrying trade.

In the stories, no means of faster-than-light interstellar communications exists. Messages between star systems must be physically carried by starships. Even using the fastest ships available as couriers, this communications "lag" between worlds has many consequences, greatly increasing the responsibility placed upon starship captains and senior military commanders far from home, complicating the coordination of military campaigns, and allowing a single accident or attack to render a planet incommunicado.

The stories include numerous dependent and independent polities and several major star nations including two giant aggregations of many planets, Haven and the Solarian League. Protagonist Honor Harrington is a citizen of the Star Kingdom of Manticore which is, during the first 20 or so works of the series, the key rival and the main stellar protagonist against the star-conquering (People's) Republic of Haven; these two nations are consciously based on Imperial Britain and Napoleonic France, although Haven also seems to be influenced by the former Soviet Union. The first books deal with a universe of escalating tensions and military incidents until war breaks out in the third novel and lasts until the formal peace in A Rising Thunder, the thirteenth mainline novel. Each star nation suffers horrendous losses at the end of the eleventh novel, At All Costs, during the Battle of Manticore, when Haven makes an all-out bid to conquer the Star Kingdom before general deployment of a feared 'super weapon'. In the anthologies, Eric Flint and Weber wrote stories that birthed the first sub-series, resulting in the novels Crown of Slaves and Torch of Freedom. The sub-series introduced some far-more dangerous adversaries, the interstellar corporations of Mesa: Manpower Unlimited, Jessyk Combine, and others. This group was then revealed to be part of the even more dangerous and hidden secret adversaries of the shadowy Mesan Alignment. The Alignment included corrupted leaders of Solarian Core worlds promoting the destruction of the old order. Mesan puppet masters are revealed to be pulling the strings of corrupt Solarian League bureaucrats and admirals in both the sub-series and the main series. Enormously ambitious, the Alignment plans the overthrow of the Solarian League, and the complete destruction of the Star Kingdom of Manticore, Haven, Beowulf, and all of those polities' historic allies.

Disruptive technological advances have been few in the Honorverse for most of the 500 years leading up to the series; as the series opens, that technological stagnation has led to a similar stagnation in both military strategy and tactics. During the course of the book series, both forms of stagnation (technological and military) are brought to a violent end by developments stemming from the Havenite/Manticoran Wars, which give both Haven and Manticore a substantial technological advantage over the Solarian League by the time of the most recently published books of the series.

Protagonist

Honor Stephanie Alexander-Harrington (née Honor Stephanie Harrington) is a fictional character created in 1992 by writer David Weber as the heroine of the eponymous "Honorverse", a universe described in a series of best-selling military science fiction books set between 4003 and 4025 AD.

Harrington is an officer in the Royal Manticoran Navy (RMN), the space navy of the Star Kingdom of Manticore, an interstellar monarchy that counterbalances its relatively small size with superior space combat technology and capability. She has a genius for tactical command, often overcoming significant odds in critical battles and frequently finding herself at the centre of significant military actions. Her dedication to duty and uncompromising performance results in receiving numerous awards and promotions, earning the respect of interstellar empires, and accumulating implacable enemies.  She is a skilled martial artist and through her association with her treecat companion Nimitz, develops an empathic sense that assists her in understanding the emotions of those around her.

Early life
Honor was born on October 1, 3961 AD (1859 PD), at Craggy Hollow (the municipal suburb community of the Harrington family home), County Duvalier, in the Duchy of Shadow Vale on the planet Sphinx, in the Manticore binary star system. Sphinx is the second inhabited planet with a long slow orbital year and long seasons orbiting around the star 'Manticore A' of the three inhabited planets of Star Kingdom of Manticore, located much farther out in the liquid water zone than the planet Manticore, which is nearer the inner margin of inhabitable zone, whereas the third inhabited world Gryphon orbits 'Manticore B'. Her ancient house and the Harrington family seat dates back to the second migration and first settlements of Sphinx and is located near the city of Yawata Crossing, which will become nearly destroyed by huge pieces of the destroyed space station, HMSS Vulcan, during the sneak attack by the Mesan Alignment in 4025 AD (1922 PD). She is the daughter of neurosurgeon Alfred Harrington and physician/geneticist Allison Benton-Ramirez y Chou Harrington, both with towering renown and fame of their own among the Manticore and Beowulf medical establishments; and her father is known to have one of the most beneficial and dominant genetically modified gene variations that he has passed onto Honor. A former officer in Manticore's Naval Medical system, he is well regarded by the Manticore admiralty as well.

Class background
Socially, by virtue of her father's ancestry, she is born a yeoman—meaning that she is a descendant of paying settlers of the second wave of settlement of the Star Kingdom of Manticore, not a member of the nobility—who for the most part can claim descent from the first colonists who invested in the joint venture purchasing settlement rights to the new system and who subsequently underwrote the migration of that first wave of colonists in slow ships to Manticore. Yeomen are socially ranked above a "zero balancer"—someone who could not afford to buy passage to Manticore during the second 'faster than light' migration wave, nor had valuable skills that the colonial government persuaded to immigrate with favorable terms, but whom the administration offered passage with a term of indenture required to pay back the colony.

Officially, yeomen have ancestors whose skills were in enough demand that Manticore paid their way. Her mother is a direct immigrant from the long-established planet Beowulf, one of Earth's first colonies, which is known for its leading research and expertise in the life sciences, and it is revealed in A Rising Thunder, her brother is one of its planetary directors—and both siblings belong to a Beowulf family famous for its intellectual, especially medical, abilities.

Genetic heritage and background
Since Honor Harrington's paternal ancestors were "genies", people genetically engineered (specifically with the Meyerdahl Beta modification) to survive on high gravity planets such as Sphinx, she not only benefits from the enhanced intellect associated with that genetic heritage, but is stronger and quicker than non-genies who grow up in the heavier gravity of Sphinx. As revealed in In Enemy Hands, this Meyerdahl Beta modification gives her more efficient muscles, enhanced reaction speed, stronger bones, tougher cardiovascular and respiratory systems, high metabolic rate, and a higher than average intelligence quotient. Her maternal ancestors are mostly from Asia, which manifests in her facial features and coloring.

Harrington is raised in the Third Stellar Missionary Communion (Reformed), but is only privately religious, as the sect is not evangelistic. She does not push her religious convictions on others, as can be seen from her respect for the religion of her Grayson subjects as a Steadholder and from the marriage ceremony in Mission of Honor.

Treecat influences
Honor is one of the few people adopted by a Sphinxian treecat, a telempathic intelligent indigenous species—who spent much of their history with humanity scouting and concealing their true abilities from mankind. The adoption process is involuntary. The bonding is more of a recognition of something that was missing suddenly being complete and so right that life without the new bond is unthinkable. A mutual adoption is essentially an empathic life-bond, and hers occurs during Honor's childhood (age 11 Earth years), a rarity since most adoptions involve adult humans. She names her 'cat Nimitz (after World War II Admiral Chester W. Nimitz), although to his own people he is known as "Laughs Brightly", a member of a clan that lives near her home, and in the treecat community, formerly being one of their scouts by occupation, as are most adopted cats since they most often interact with the humans they are spying upon.

Honor is known to the treecats as "Dances on Clouds" for her frequent climbs up into the Copperwall Mountains overlooking her parents' house to launch a hang glider with Nimitz on her back. Having conducted considerable research, she is one of the foremost experts on treecats, and is a descendant of and in-part named after Stephanie Harrington—the first human to bond with treecats when she figured out what was causing "the Great Disappearing Celery mystery" and ambushed Climbs Quickly in the act of treecat burglary—surprising both races with the resultant bonding that nearly ended the life of both sapients.
 
Improving upon all her ancestors' knowledge, Honor enjoys a closer empathic link with Nimitz than any before, deepening over thirty some T-years  to enable her to "taste" the emotions of other humans around her through Nimitz in the earlier works of the series—for example when she foiled the attempt to assassinate the Protector of Grayson in the second novel, The Honor of the Queen. Later books drop hints that Honor may be developing empathic talents of her own even as her life became complicated by the courtship, marriage and pregnancy of Nimitz's mate Samantha in Honor Among Enemies. This hint of psi talents blossomed under stress during her captivity on the way to the prison planet Hades when she is held far apart from Nimitz (in In Enemy Hands), and thereafter gradually becomes an overt capability she initially prefers not to have, then accepts. The ability grows gradually into a formidable ability to "read people correctly" as perceived by outsiders, but is from the start always a closely guarded secret. Eventually, it becomes overtly recognized by her closest confidants and suspected by a few others. It eventually becomes a nearly open secret acknowledged to various other high-ranking allies in the novels after Ashes of Victory. For example, in A Rising Thunder this point is directly addressed in dialog with the Haven diplomatic delegation visiting Manticore in the discussion about whether the Mesan Alignment actually exists.

Honor's career and the success of the collected works in the Honorverse really cannot be understood without her association with Nimitz and then, through him, her association with other treecats, as is gradually revealed through stories such as Changer of Worlds where the treecat community endorses Samantha and Nimitz's decision to emigrate with volunteers and their kittens off planet. The encounter and other short stories in the anthologies provides much deep background about human-treecat relations, and reveal, as explicitly stated in A Rising Thunder, the treecat elders and society as a whole have effective recordings of their experiences with humanity through the offices of their Memory Singers, like Samantha, and further they confer planetwide about decisions regarding their relationships with humanity. In that thirteenth Honor Harrington novel, the treecat Memory Singers examine their collective memory to aid the alliance forming to oppose the Mesan Alignment and the Solarian League. One result is the treecats 'enlist' in the alliance to act as truth detectors, capable of sensing when a trusted individual has been subjected to Mesan psychological manipulation into involuntarily performing complex acts that are often suicidal.

Career

At the Academy
Harrington attends Saganami Naval Academy on Manticore. At Saganami Island, her roommate and best friend is Michelle "Mike" Henke, paternal first cousin of Queen Elizabeth III of Manticore. Shy and lacking in self-confidence, Harrington learns much from "Mike" Henke during those years. 

At the Academy, Midshipman Lord Pavel Young, heir to the earldom of North Hollow, attempts to rape her in the showers, but she defends herself, sending him to the hospital. Although the Academy commandant suspects the truth, her shame and low self-esteem keep her from pressing formal charges. Young thus escapes with a reprimand for conduct unbecoming rather than dismissal from the Academy. Her outstanding abilities (along with some behind-the-scenes maneuvering by her mentor, Raoul Courvosier) result in her career advancement, steadily, if erratically, despite the enmity of the powerful Young clan and various attempts by it and its allies to sabotage her Royal Manticoran Navy (RMN) career.

Her midshipwoman or "snotty" cruise aboard HMS War Maiden, under Captain Bachfisch, demonstrates her skill as a combat tactician when, during an engagement with Silesian rebels, the rest of the command team are killed, disabled, or cut off from the rest of the ship. She assumes command and finishes off the enemy ship. She is promoted ahead of her class to ensign.

In command

Early commands
Harrington's first command is a light attack craft (LAC). She is later given command of the aged destroyer HMS Hawkwing, and after a year of service goes to the RMN's Advanced Tactical Course. Harrington graduates high in the course, and immediately assumes command of the light cruiser HMS Fearless as a commander. Her exploits while posted at Basilisk Station bring her widespread fame—and an in absentia sentence of death from the People's Republic of Haven. Now firmly on the fast track, she proves to have something akin to the Nelson touch, earning the devotion of her officers and enlisted personnel, as well as the high regard of both Manticore's allies (especially Grayson), and her military opponents. However, she also makes new enemies. The name HMS Fearless is entered into the RMN's Roll of Honor, and Harrington is selected to command the new HMS Fearless, a Star Knight–class heavy cruiser, when it is launched.

In the news
In the second novel, The Honor of the Queen, Reginald Houseman becomes acting head of the Manticoran delegation to Grayson after the death of Admiral Courvosier in a Havenite/Masadan attack. Houseman panics and orders the illegal evacuation of Manticorans after the First Battle of Yeltsin.  Houseman makes the mistake of personally threatening to ruin Harrington's career for refusing to follow his orders and abandon Grayson to her enemies. Harrington slaps Houseman hard enough to fling him across the room, then defeats a much stronger enemy force. Harrington receives a letter of reprimand for striking Houseman, but is also knighted, awarded several medals, ennobled by Grayson as one of its few Steadholders, and further ennobled in the Star Kingdom as Countess Harrington.

After a year's convalescent leave, having lost her eye in the defense of Grayson, she is given the newly commissioned, state-of-the-art battlecruiser Nike and made flag captain of a new squadron, before again encountering Pavel Young. Prior to Captain Young's arrival at the forward base called Hancock Station, Harrington had become romantically involved with his former executive officer, whom Young blames in part for troubles he experienced after trying to strike back at Harrington in the first book.
 
Attached to a cruiser squadron assigned as screening elements for her battlecruiser squadron in The Short Victorious War, Young disobeys Harrington's explicit orders (after she takes command upon the incapacitation of Admiral Mark Sarnow in combat) and flees in the book's climactic space battle, resulting in additional Manticoran deaths and losses, when Haven finally begins the war long expected by both sides.

A political target
Field of Dishonor begins with Young's court-martial and cashiering, and continues with his decision, as Lord North Hollow, to take revenge upon Harrington, the RMN, and Paul Tankersley. North Hollow pays a professional duelist to goad Tankersley into a duel to hurt Harrington, then kill her afterwards. Captain Tankersley is killed while Harrington is away on Grayson to be invested as Steadholder Harrington and learn her duties and responsibilities.

An infamous duelist
With North Hollow's involvement in Tankersley's death uncovered, Harrington kills North Hollow's hired gun in a duel, terrifying Young with the ease with which she does it. Following a failed attempt to assassinate her in a public restaurant, Harrington is determined to exact revenge. Her friends try to dissuade her, as her naval career would be destroyed. Young tries to avoid her until the Navy can assign her to duties off-world, but she finally meets him face-to-face and forces him into accepting a duel. Though he treacherously fires early, she kills him. Because Young is a sitting Member of Parliament, Harrington was beached by the Manticoran Navy, setting the backstory for Flag in Exile. 

Moving to Harrington Steading, she finds herself at the heart of political dissent, turmoil, discord and conservatives opposing the reforms instituted by Protector Benjamin Mayhew, such as female Steadholders and women officers. The Grayson Space Navy (GSN) eventually recruits her, making her the second ranking admiral in their young, rapidly expanding navy. 

However, conspirators sabotage a building being constructed by a company she set up, causing the deaths of children. Her Grayson enemies place the blame on Harrington, but the sabotage is uncovered through forensic engineering. The saboteurs then try to assassinate her before she can reveal her findings, only to inadvertently kill the head of Grayson's Church. Though seriously injured, she confronts Steadholder Burdette, one of the head conspirators, and personally kills him in a formal sword duel. 

She cannot rest, however, as an enemy battle fleet comes calling. Harrington once again saves the planet from invasion, this time by deceiving a Havenite task force into a fatal blunder, earning her the adulation of the nearly all the people. 

Honor is again offered a command in the RMN, though her political enemies seek to discredit her by making her mission a seemingly impossible one: the suppression of the rampant piracy in the Silesian Confederation with grossly inadequate ships, all that the overstretched RMN can scrape together. Knowing this, her strong sense of duty makes her accept anyway.

Rehabilitated by the opposition
She is given command of four Q-ships as a de facto commodore and starship captain— four converted merchant ships turned into merchant cruisers. These cruisers are also light carriers, each carrying a dozen new, advanced light attack craft. Her experience with these units results in the militarily revolutionary pod-superdreadnought classes which will come to dominate the new military reality. She rescues a planet from a pirate flotilla, defeats a Havenite commerce raiding fleet and impresses a senior officer of the Andermani Empire.

Commodore Harrington
When Harrington is captured by Haven en route to a new command in In Enemy Hands, the death sentence for the Basilisk Station action—delivered in absentia in a show trial under the pre-revolutionary government of old Haven—is ordered to be carried out by the new revolutionary regime. En route to the secret prison planet of Hades, Chief Petty Officer Horace Harkness, who pretended to be a turncoat, hacks into the ship's computers and stages a jail break when the People's Navy Ship (PNS) Tepes arrives in orbit. Honor loses an arm in the breakout, which costs the lives of a number of subordinates dear to her heart. However, her party manages to escape in two shuttles while using a third to destroy the Tepes, killing the most sadistic member of Haven's ruling triumvirate, Cordelia Ransom. Harrington's shuttles set down on the planet undetected, except by one officer, who informs her commander. He, appalled at Ransom's brutal treatment of Harrington during the voyage, keeps quiet and erases the record of the escape.

As Echoes of Honor begins, assuming Harrington was also killed in the explosion, the PRH propaganda office releases a fake video recording of her "execution". As a result, simultaneous state funerals are staged for her on both Manticore and Grayson, while she is recuperating and formulating plans to take over the prisoner-of-war camps on Hades. 

She and her people eavesdrop on Hell's communications, contact and organize the prisoners and overthrow the guards. One shuttle is used to neutralize the People's courier boat in orbit, so no alarm is raised. Eventually, Harrington manages to capture sufficient PNS naval ships and transports to carry the well over 100,000 prisoners, including political and military figures Haven reported as having been executed, to freedom. They also take records and interviews revealing who was really behind the revolution and the bloody attack on the former government of the People's Republic of Haven.

Admiral Harrington
Forced to undergo extensive reconstructive surgery for the missing limb and re-rehabilitate the prior reconstructive surgery to her face and eye which the Peep guards had short circuited, Ashes of Victory sees the newly minted Duchess Harrington offered the opportunity to take charge of the alliance's premier naval academy at Saganami Island. She is jumped three grades in Manticorian service (skipping the ranks of rear admiral and vice admiral), giving her the requisite rank for the position. Her team develops the tactics and doctrines necessitated by the revolutionary new weapons Manticore has developed. These are adopted by the Eighth Fleet, under Admiral Alexander, in its new offensive using the new technologies of Ghost Rider, LAC strike carriers, and pod-superdreadnaughts. 

At the end of Ashes of Victory, Harrington maneuvers her private intrasystem yacht to stop a missile strike targeting one spaceship, saving Queen Elizabeth and Protector Benjamin, but cannot save another ship carrying the star nation's prime minister and other high-ranking officials. As a result, the Manticoran government falls, and the new government is made up of a coalition of parties hostile to Harrington and the Queen, with no real interest of settling the war with Haven, and the new management in the Admiralty put Honor and Admiral White Haven on half-pay, so the two become the voice of the loyal opposition in the upper house of the Manticoran Parliament.

Honor the politician
The new government is corrupt and venal, looking for ways to take money from military projects and under the slogan of 'building the peace', divert the same tax base to pet projects where they can have minions siphon off funds to contributors and personal wealth, while simultaneously maintaining the state of emergency that prevents an automatic election because of pending changes in the House of Lords due to the annexation of Trevor's Star into the Star Kingdom. Having become a political thorn in the side of the government for over three years, the government concocts ways to smear Honor and Hamish Alexander, depicting the two as sexual partners. Despite Alexander's pre-existing marriage, the pair defuse the situation by entering into a polygamous marriage, something that is commonplace on Grayson. The government then decides the deteriorating situation in Silesia warrants sending Honor in command of a fleet to check expansionist activity by the Andermani Empire. War of Honor details this political backstory and the military build down by the corrupt government which is also antagonizing its allies as well as the new Haven government under President Eloise Pritchart, which is trying to make a peace settlement. Haven becomes tired of being put off in the peace talks and, having received technological upgrades from a secret research and development program and observed the many blunders of the Manticoran government which have weakened the RMN, decides to attack. Hearing that Honor is being given a weak fleet in Silesian space, the Havenites reason that they can also attack there and deal a blow to Manticorian morale by defeating Harrington.
 
Harrington is sent with an inadequate RMN force, but Protector Benjamin insists on reinforcing her with a special unit, The Protector's Own. Getting a whiff from an intelligence source, she mousetraps the Havenite fleet, even as all the other Havenite attacks succeed, pushing the Manticorans back from all the systems they had occupied and destroying their picket units. The worst damage is the destruction of the extensive satellite shipyards in the Grendlesbane Star System, where many of the RMN's new ships were being constructed.

RMN Fleet Admiral
The corrupt government seeks to form a coalition war cabinet, but the Queen blocks the effort, so the government falls, returning the Crown Loyalist and Centrist coalition to power, under the brother of Hamish Alexander, who is made First Lord of the Admiralty—with the government needing someone trustworthy to undo the damage inflicted by the previous administration.

In At All Costs, Harrington is given command of the Eighth Fleet, a heavy assault force of advanced capital ships, and new weapons of unmatched abilities. But overall, the Manticoran fleet has become severely weakened, and she must devise a strategy to keep the Republic of Haven off balance until the fleet can be built up. Under her leadership, the fleet begins a campaign to dismantle the industrial base of the Republic of Haven, by sailing deep behind enemy lines and raiding Havenite space based infrastructure, forcing the republic to go on the defensive and worry which of its systems will suffer next. Haven deploys a counter strategy that eventually causes severe damage to Eighth fleet during one raid when they use her own tactics from Silesian space against her forces, and the offensive campaign is temporarily put on hold. During this battle, Michelle Henke is captured by the Republic of Haven, setting the stage for Storm from the Shadows.

Manticore then fields a new weapon system, "Apollo", that not only neutralizes the new system defense systems Haven is deploying, but also turns the tide of the war, as it renders modern missile defensive systems effectively worthless, and further, capitalizes on the new MDM Ghost Rider missiles that have been in the field by enhancing their long range accuracy. Realizing his nation's poor strategic position, Admiral Thomas Theisman of Haven resolves to launch one final massive, desperate strike on the Manticore system itself, hoping to end the war before Apollo can be widely distributed in the field to all units by the Royal Manticoran Navy. This attack almost succeeds and completely destroys most of the Manticoran fleet protecting the home system, and almost as much of Third Fleet, normally deployed to defend the Trevor's Star wormhole terminus deep within the spatial volume of the Republic of Haven.

At the last moment, Harrington and Eighth Fleet arrives coming through the wormhole from Trevor's Star as well and equipped with Apollo, use it to decimate the sole strong remaining attacking Havenite fleet and threaten the remnant forces still in the battleground—forcing their capitulation and capture. Involving hundreds of ships of the wall on both sides, the Battle of Manticore is the largest naval engagement in human history, and it is extremely costly for both sides. Harrington's long-time friend Alistair McKeon is killed, and most of the Manticoran Navy's non-pod capital ships are destroyed (Eighth Fleet is the only remaining combat ready force, aside from miscellaneous units—garrison, in transit, in refit, ...). Eighth Fleet assumes the duties and title of Home Fleet (the defense of the Manticore system itself). Haven loses more than 90% of the forces deployed during the attack, and its best tactician, Lester Tourville, is captured after he surrenders what remains of his force to Harrington. An effective truce between the two sides goes into effect, as neither nation possesses the capability to continue offensive operations.

Honor the diplomat
Events in a new addition to the Star Kingdom, the Talbott Cluster, grow more problematic. The megalomaniac outlaw corporation Manpower Incorporated and the planet 'Mesa' continue their plans to dislodge Manticore from the cluster, and they immediately put another plan into action, following the failure of their first attempts as recounted in The Shadow of Saganami. They seek to start a conflict between Manticore and the Solarian League in order to remove the Cluster from the Star Kingdom and for other, as yet unknown, reasons. Despite Haven's attack on Manticore, Harrington is shown in Storm from the Shadows as an advocate for at least partial reconciliation with Haven, as it increasingly appears that war with the Solarian League is inevitable. During her brief appearance in Storm, Harrington discusses potential long-term strategy against the Solarian League with the Manticoran leadership, including Queen Elizabeth, whom she persuades to give the Solarian threat a priority over Haven.

In Mission of Honor, Admiral Harrington is assigned as envoy to Haven.  After a successful attack by the Mesa Alignment Navy on the Space Stations of the Manticore home system, Harrington helps bring about an alliance between the Star Empire and Haven against Mesa / Manpower. She subsequently becomes the first commanding officer of the newly created, multinational Grand Fleet.

Posts

 Midshipwoman, RMN Naval Academy, Saganami Island, c1876 P.D.
 Midshipwoman, Assistant Tactical Officer (acting), Assistant Tactical Officer, HMS War Maiden, CA-39, c1880 P.D.: Ms. Midshipwoman Harrington
 Artillery Officer Candidate, Second Assistant Artillery Officer, HMS Royal Winton, DN-12
 Sailing Master, HMS Osprey, FG-1069
 Second Assistant Tactical Officer, Assistant Tactical Officer, HMS Manticore, SD-01
 Commanding Officer, HM LAC 113
 Executive Officer, HMS Trenchant, CL-19
 Executive Officer, HMS Broadsword, CA-47, c1890 P.D.: The Hard Way Home
 Executive Officer, HMS Perseus, CL-92
 Tactical Officer, HMS Basilisk, SD-105
 Student, Ship Commanders Course, Saganami Island
 Commanding Officer, HMS Hawkwing, DD-1213 c1899 P.D.: "Let's Dance!"
 Student, Advanced Tactical Course, Saganami Island
 Commanding Officer, HMS Fearless, CL-56, Commanding Officer (acting), RMN Basilisk Station, c1900 P.D. (March 3) - c1901 P.D. (January): On Basilisk Station
 Commanding Officer, HMS Fearless, CA-286, c1901 P.D. - c1903 P.D.: With One Stone, The Honor of the Queen
 Commanding Officer, HMS Nike, BC-413, c1904 P.D. -	c1905 P.D.: The Short Victorious War - Field of Dishonor
 Commanding Officer, GSN's First Battle Squadron, c1907 P.D.: Flag in Exile
 Commanding Officer, RMN Task Group 1037, Commanding Officer, HMAMC Wayfarer, AMC-, c1908 P.D. (September) - c1910 P.D. (March): Honor Among Enemies
 Commanding Officer, RMN Cruiser Squadron Eighteen, c1911 P.D.: In Enemy Hands
 Commanding Officer, allied and non-allied members of armed forces on planet Hades, Elysian Space Navy, 1911 - 1913 P.D.: Echoes of Honor
 Commandant, Saganami Island Advanced Tactical Course, Tactical Instructor, RMN Naval Academy, c1913 P.D. (December) - c1915 P.D. (May): Ashes of Victory
 Commanding Officer, GSN's Protector's Own Squadron, since c1914 P.D.: Ashes of Victory–At All Costs
 Commanding Officer, RMN Sidemore Station, Commanding Officer, RMN Task Force 34, c1918 P.D. - c1920 P.D.: War of Honor
 Commanding Officer, RMN Eighth Fleet, c1920 P.D. (July) - c1922 P.D. (May): At All Costs, Mission of Honor
 Commanding Officer, HMS Unconquered, since c1920 P.D. (July): At All Costs
 Commanding Officer, RMN Home Fleet, since c1921 P.D. (August): At All Costs
 Commanding Officer, RMN Eighth Fleet: War of Honor
 Commanding Officer, Allied Grand Fleet: A Rising Thunder

Concept and creation
David Weber didn't set out to create a female protagonist; "it was the way the character came to me," Weber explains. "I didn't set out to do it because I thought that it was especially politically sensitive on my part or because I thought it was likely to strike a chord with female readership or be a financial success. It was just the way that the character first presented herself." Weber doesn't find writing a female character particularly challenging, because, he says, "I'm writing about a human being who happens to be female." When he first started writing, he had developed her entire back story before he started the first book. However, since he knew from the beginning that these books would become a
series, he deliberately set Honor up as a character who changes and grows. One example Weber offers is that in The Short Victorious War, Honor off-handedly refers to her genetically enhanced metabolism, which isn't fully explored until In Enemy Hands: "It was one of those little things that I knew about or that I was holding in reserve," Weber says.

The first name of his character - Honor - had come to Weber long before the last name did. Weber knew that if the Honor novels worked, she was inevitably going to be compared to C. S. Forester's Horatio Hornblower, so he saw to it that she had the same initials. He said, "There are certainly, clearly, similarities between the two. There are also huge differences. And Honor has never been as neurotic as Hornblower was. Hornblower always carried a massive sense of inferiority around with him. Honor never did." Weber also feels that in the later books in the series, she has more in common with Admiral Horatio Nelson than Hornblower. Weber revealed in the foreword to Storm from the Shadows that it had originally been his intent to kill her off in the Battle of Manticore, thus further echoing Nelson's death (in his greatest battle, Trafalgar) and have the emerging Mesa problem be dealt with by the next generation, specifically her children. When writing At All Costs, he decided instead to keep her alive, and move the Mesan-related events up, to be her problem.

Publication
Many of Weber's books are available at the Baen Free Library; chapters of some texts are otherwise available online. The first-edition hardcover releases of War of Honor, At All Costs, Torch of Freedom, and Mission of Honor contained a CD with copies of most of Weber's published books at the time, labeled for free redistribution.

Honor Harrington series
 On Basilisk Station (April 1992)  / HH1
 The Honor of the Queen (June 1993)  / HH2
 The Short Victorious War (April 1994)  / HH3
 Field of Dishonor (December 1994)  / HH4
 Flag in Exile (September 1995)  / HH5
 Honor Among Enemies (February 1996)  / HH6
 In Enemy Hands (July 1997)  / HH7
 Echoes of Honor (October 1998)  / HH8
 Ashes of Victory (March 2000)  / HH9
 War of Honor (October 2002)  / HH10
 At All Costs (November 2005)  / HH11
 Mission of Honor (June 2010)  / HH12
 A Rising Thunder (March 2012)  / HH13
 Uncompromising Honor (October 2018)  / HH14

The Honor Harrington series has been produced several times in audiobook format, at first in cassette (90 min) format by Library of Congress, narrated by Madelyn Buzzard (books 1–10), later by Audible Frontiers beginning in 2009, narrated by Allyson Johnson.

Spin-offs
The Honorverse is a tightly plotted, highly organized invention that was designed with a specific overarching storyline. Its storyline has shifted from the original plan to include new enemies, and did not result in the battle death of heroine Honor Harrington, as was planned originally for book five, and then later for book eleven. The series' canon is maintained solely by its creator, who acts as editor of the works in the universe by other collaborating authors.

Like some of the strategy employed by co-author Eric Flint in his 1632 series, the series has, starting with War of Honor, begun incorporating a broader viewpoint from more than one central character, many of whom, like in the 1632 series, appeared in other series works as supporting characters. Stories in the Worlds of Honor collections directly lead to events and character stars of the Crown of Slaves (CoS) sub-series, whereas the Shadow of Saganamis star cast and some of the characters of the CoS derive directly from the mainline novels. Both contain purposely invented new protagonist characters as well. Weber deliberately has synchronized events in the mainline series with the tellings of local knowledge and vice versa in both sub-series. In other words, the broad front on which he is now telling the overall story is geographically distinct, but synchronized in his timeline: events in one quadrant will affect life and events in the related narratives centred on other main characters.

Short fiction in the series serves as deep backstory or, like the short stories centred directly on Honor Harrington, exposes episodes of her earlier career in much the same way C. S. Forester revealed the not-yet-in-command life of the young Horatio Hornblower. Some of the more important of these tales reveal a greater knowledge of Sphinx's native species, letting the reader in on knowledge not known even to the Honorverse occupants. Among these tales are the revealed history of how treecats and humans first bonded, how the treecats protected and bonded with the Royal family, and other treecat tales of greater or lesser importance, such as how the treecat society decided to migrate to the stars. Other short stories expose points of view and life problems from places around the larger universe. Some offer insights to life behind enemy lines in the view of its citizens and their experience, or that of a protagonist in the Verge, or in the Solarian League.

Worlds of Honor anthologies
Stories and essays by David Weber and many other authors Weber invited to expand his Honor Harrington universe. The stories in these anthologies may either precede or be concurrent with the main Honor Harrington series.

 More Than Honor (January 1998)  / HHA1—three stories by authors David Weber, David Drake, and S. M. Stirling plus a Honorverse background history, and including the story in which treecats and some of their characteristics first come to human knowledge.
 Worlds of Honor (February 1999)  / HHA2—five stories by authors David Weber (two stories), Linda Evans, Jane Lindskold and Roland J. Green.
 Changer of Worlds (March 2001)  / HHA3—four stories by authors David Weber (three stories) and Eric Flint. The short novel Ms. Midshipwoman Harrington is built around the Honorverse's eponymous character.
 The Service of the Sword (April 2003)  / HHA4—six stories by authors David Weber, Jane Lindskold, Timothy Zahn, John Ringo, and Eric Flint; one by John Ringo and Victor Mitchell jointly. Originally to have been titled In Fire Forged—a title that was re-used for a different book in 2011.
 In Fire Forged (February 2011)  / HHA5
 Beginnings (July 2013)  / HHA6
 What Price Victory? (February 2023)  / HHA7—stories by Timothy Zahn & Thomas Pope, Jane Lindskold, Jan Kotouč, Joelle Presby and David Weber

Crown of Slaves series
The story of agents Anton Zilwicke (Manticore) and Victor Cachat (Haven) and their strange alliance to uncover the dark power that manipulated their two nations into war, and put an end to the true enemy's plans. This series is concurrent with the main Honor Harrington series.

 From the Highlands (short novel in Changer of Worlds) by Eric Flint—introduces the main characters of the series.
 Fanatic (novella in The Service of the Sword) by Eric Flint—furthers the character of Victor Cachat.
 Crown of Slaves (September 2003)  / CS1; with Eric Flint—the two character groups introduced in From the Highlands re-encounter each other at a state funeral in Erewhon. High-level international politics and spy-craft ensue.
 Torch of Freedom (November 2009)  / CS2; with Eric Flint—Victor Cachat and Anton Zilwicki, the universe's two top spies, work together to undertake a dangerous mission to the heart of Mesa, home of the evil corporation Manpower Unlimited, to gather information that may end the second war between their respective governments, Haven and Manticore.
 Cauldron of Ghosts (eBook March 15, 2014, hardcover April 8, 2014)  / CS3; with Eric Flint—Zilwicki and Cachat return to Mesa—only to discover that even they have underestimated the Alignment's ruthlessness and savagery.
 To End in Fire (October 5, 2021)  / CS4; with Eric Flint—Agents of the Grand Alliance join forces with Solarians to uncover the vast interstellar conspiracy operating against them.

Shadow series
The story of Admiral Michelle Henke and several graduates of Saganami Island when the Star Kingdom annexes the Talbott Cluster to become the Star Empire. (Also referred to as the Saganami Island series.) This series is concurrent with the main Honor Harrington series.

 The Shadow of Saganami (October 2004)  / SI1: The novel is primarily set in the remote Talbott Cluster, connected to Manticore via a newly discovered junction terminus, and includes characters already introduced in other works, such as Helen Zilwicki and Abigail Hearns, as well as brief appearances by many others.
 Storm from the Shadows (March 2009)  / SI2: The novel continues the events in the Talbott Cluster (now Quadrant), and centers around Honor Harrington's best friend Admiral Michelle Henke and characters from the original book of the series. The events of the book include the results of Talbott government's signing its constitution and becoming part of the Star Empire of Manticore. The shadow conflict between Mesa and Manticore heats up as more Mesa-orchestrated incidents accrue to bring about war between Manticore and the Solarian League.
 Shadow of Freedom (March 2013) ,  / SI3: The novel continues the events in the Talbott Quadrant as the conflict with the Solarian League turns to outright war. Attacks on Manticoran shipping by Frontier Security and continued manipulation by the Mesan Alignment spur Admiral Henke to first react, then adopt a policy of offensive (versus defensive) operations. This culminates in Manticore's first offensive victory of the war, the previous Manticoran victories having been defensive in nature.
 Shadow of Victory (November 1, 2016)  / SI4

The Star Kingdom series
This series features Stephanie Harrington, Honor Harrington's distant ancestor, and the first human to be adopted by a treecat. This series precedes the main Honor Harrington series.

 A Beautiful Friendship (October 2011)  / SK1
 Fire Season (October 15, 2012) by David Weber and Jane Lindskold  / SK2
 Treecat Wars (October 1, 2013) by David Weber and Jane Lindskold  / SK3
 A New Clan (June 7, 2022) by David Weber and Jane Lindskold  / SK4

Manticore Ascendant series
This series, which begins eleven years after the first book in The Star Kingdom series, features Travis Uriah Long, an enlisted Navy man and later an officer, and is centered on the small Manticoran Navy of that time. This series precedes the main Honor Harrington series.

 A Call to Duty (September 15, 2014) by David Weber and Timothy Zahn.  / MA1
 A Call to Arms (October 6, 2015) by David Weber and Timothy Zahn with Thomas Pope.  / MA2 It is expanded from the short story of the same name originally published in the Beginnings anthology.
 A Call to Vengeance (March 7, 2018) by David Weber and Timothy Zahn with Thomas Pope.  / MA3
 A Call to Insurrection (February 1, 2022) by David Weber and Timothy Zahn with Thomas Pope.  / MA4

Companion
House of Steel: The Honorverse Companion (May 7, 2013) —Includes the new short novel I Will Build My House of Steel by David Weber.

Ad Astra databooks
 Honor Harrington: Saganami Island Tactical Simulator (2005) 

 Saganami Island Tactical Simulator fleet boxes
 Honor Harrington: Saganami Island Tactical Simulator: Manticoran Fleet Box 1 (2006) 
 Honor Harrington: Saganami Island Tactical Simulator: Havenite Fleet Box 1 (2006) 
 Honor Harrington: Saganami Island Tactical Simulator: Andermani Fleet Box 1 (2006) 
 Honor Harrington: Saganami Island Tactical Simulator: Silesian Fleet Box 1 (2006) 
 Honor Harrington: Saganami Island Tactical Simulator: Havenite Fleet Box 2 (2010)

 Ship books
 Honor Harrington: Saganami Island Tactical Simulator: Shipbook 2: Silesian Confederacy (2006) 
 Honor Harrington: Saganami Island Tactical Simulator: Shipbook 3: The Short Victorious War (2010)

 Jayne's Intelligence Review
 Jayne's Intelligence Review: The Royal Manticoran Navy (2006) 
 Jayne's Intelligence Review: The People's Republican Navy (2007) 

 Ships of the Fleet
 Honor Harrington: Ships of the Fleet: 2006 (2005) 
 Honor Harrington: Ships of the Fleet: 2007 (2006)

Other collections containing Honorverse stories
 The Warmasters (May 2002) : A multi-author anthology, containing the Honorverse short novel Ms. Midshipwoman Harrington. The story has previously appeared in a Worlds of Honor collection.
 Worlds of Weber (September 2008) /: A David Weber anthology that includes nine short stories, set both in and out of the Honorverse. The two Honorverse stories have previously appeared in Worlds of Honor collections.
 Worlds (February 2009) : An Eric Flint anthology that contains the Honorverse short novel From the Highlands. The story has previously appeared in a Worlds of Honor collection.
 Infinite Stars (October 2017) : A Bryan Thomas Schmidt anthology that contains the never previously published Honorverse short story "Our Sacred Honor".
 Noir Fatale (May 2019) : A multi-author anthology edited by Larry Correia and Kacey Ezell that contains the never previously published Honorverse short story "Recruiting Exercise".
 Give Me Libertycon (June 2020) : A multi-author anthology edited by Christopher Woods and T.K.F. Weisskopf that contains the never previously published Honorverse short story "Heart of Stone". The story is expanded on in the Star Kingdom series novel A New Clan.
Onward Libertycon (June 2022) : A multi-author anthology edited by Christopher Woods and T.K.F. Weisskopf that contains the never previously published Honorverse short story "A Travesty of Nature"

In other media
In 2006, an Honor Harrington movie was announced by Echo Valley Entertainment.
However, later information suggested that it would actually be a television series, to be written and produced by Peter Sands. When David Weber was asked which actress he envisioned as Honor Harrington, he replied, "I don’t think there’s anyone out there who has the proper combination of height, physicality, and demonstrated acting ability to be 'perfect' for the role, so my mind is fairly open on this topic." Actress Claudia Christian, who plays Susan Ivanova on Babylon 5, has been suggested as a potential candidate; Weber says "She’s much shorter than Honor, but so are most women, and I think she could handle the physicality... I think it’s more important to have someone who can portray Honor’s character and command style than it is to have someone who is six feet two inches tall." Weber's concern is that the director would push Christian to re-create Ivanova's character while playing Honor and "Ivanova’s command style is totally different from Honor’s."

An Honor Harrington wargame, Saganami Island Tactical Simulator (SITS), was released at Gen Con in 2005 by Ad Astra Games.

An Honor Harrington video game called Honorverse: The Online Game was announced in August 2008; a beta was scheduled to be released in the Spring of 2010.

In 2014 Evergreen Studios announced plans to make a multi-platform adaptation of the Honor Harrington character, under the title Tales of Honor. A mobile game called Tales of Honor: The Secret Fleet was released that year for Android and iOS platforms. Tentative plans at that point also included a television series and a feature film. Evergreen Studios shut down in 2015, which led to the cancelation of most of their projects, including the mobile game, which is no longer available.

Also, in 2014, a five-issue comic book mini-series Tales Of Honor: On Basilisk Station from Top Cow Productions begun on March 5, 2014 concluding later that year. In 2015, Top Cow also released Tales Of Honor: Bred to Kill.

Stories listed by internal chronology

See also

 List of Honorverse characters
 List of fictional universes in literature

References

Further reading
  An epistolary short side story in the Honorverse.

External links
 Baen Books, publisher of Honorverse works
 Honorverse wikia
 HonorverseCD/ David Weber CD free versions of Honorverse works
 Baen Free Library free versions of On Basilisk Station, The Honor of the Queen, Changer of Worlds, Crown of Slaves, and The Shadow of Saganami.
 The Universe of Honor Harrington, a detailed description of the Honorverse, by David Weber
 Joe Buckley's InfoDump, includes maps, a timeline and a collection of Weber's forum posts relating to the Honorverse

 
Book series introduced in 1992
Military science fiction
Science fiction book series
Novel series